Tornos benjamini is a species of geometrid moth in the family Geometridae. It is found in Central America and North America.

The MONA or Hodges number for Tornos benjamini is 6483.

References

Further reading

 
 

Boarmiini
Articles created by Qbugbot
Moths described in 1925